Helmut Werzer was a West German bobsledder who competed in the sport during the 1960s. He won a gold medal in the four-man event at the 1966 FIBT World Championships after his teammate Toni Pensperger was killed during the event. Pensperger would be posthumously awarded the gold medal which Werzer and his surviving teammates Ludwig Siebert and Roland Ebert received.

References

External links
Bobsleigh four-man world championship medalists since 1930

German male bobsledders
Possibly living people
Year of birth missing